Sir Nicholas le Strange (1 January 1511 – 19 February 1580) of Hunstanton, Norfolk, was an English Member of Parliament (MP).

The eldest son of Sir Thomas Le Strange, he succeeded his father in 1545 and was knighted in 1547. His mother was Anne, a daughter of Nicholas Vaux, 1st Baron Vaux of Harrowden. He had a brother Richard Lestrange, who was also a Norfolk MP.

He was appointed a Justice of the Peace for Norfolk for 1538–1547, 1558/59–1571 and from 1579 for life, and High Sheriff of Norfolk and Suffolk for 1548–49. He was appointed as steward of the manors of the Duchess of Richmond in 1546, and also Chamberlain to the Duke of Norfolk. On 15 September 1549 he wrote to William Cecil, the king's attorney, denying any sympathy with Kett's rebellion.  In March 1552, during the reign of Edward VI, le Strange succeeded Sir Walter Buckler as chamberlain to Princess Elizabeth's household at Hatfield, Hertfordshire.

Almost certainly at the Duke of Norfolk's nomination, he was elected MP for the County of Norfolk in the Parliament of 1547, for King's Lynn in 1555 and Castle Rising in 1558, 1559, 1563 and 1571. (His brother, Richard L'Estrange, also sat as an MP for boroughs under the Duke of Norfolk's influence in 1559 and 1563.) He was not elected to Parliament again after Norfolk's fall in 1572. In May 1571 he conveyed his estates to his eldest son, Hamon, and moved to King's Lynn.

He married twice: firstly in 1528 Eleanor, daughter of William Fitzwilliam (Sheriff of London) of Milton, Northamptonshire with whom he had three sons and two daughters and secondly in 1546 Katherine, the daughter of John Hyde of Hyde, Dorset and widow of Nicholas Mynn of Great Fransham, Norfolk. He was buried 19 February 1580 at Sedgeford, Norfolk. Sir Hamon le Strange (1583–1654), also an MP, was a descendant of this Nicholas through his son Hamon, who died soon after him, and his grandson Nicholas (buried 1592).

References

Concise Dictionary of National Biography (1930)
J E Neale, The Elizabethan House of Commons (London: Jonathan Cape, 1949)
Deed of Appointment as Steward to Mary, Duchess of Richmond in Norfolk Record Office (ref: NG4)
Marriage settlement dated 4 June 1528 states he "will be 21 years on 1 January 1532" (ref: Norfolk Record Office A42)

1511 births
1580 deaths
People from Hunstanton
English knights
High Sheriffs of Norfolk
High Sheriffs of Suffolk
English MPs 1547–1552
English MPs 1555
English MPs 1558
English MPs 1559
English MPs 1563–1567
English MPs 1571
Members of Parliament for Norfolk
Le Strange family